The finite promise games are a collection of mathematical games developed by American mathematician Harvey Friedman in 2009 which are used to develop a family of fast-growing functions ,  and .

 represents the theory of ZFC plus, for each , "there is a strongly -Mahlo cardinal", and  represents the theory of ZFC plus "for each , there is a strongly -Mahlo cardinal".  represents the theory of ZFC plus, for each , "there is a -stationary Ramsey cardinal", and  represents the theory of ZFC plus "for each , there is a strongly -stationary Ramsey cardinal".  represents the theory of ZFC plus, for each , "there is a -huge cardinal", and  represents the theory of ZFC plus "for each , there is a strongly -huge cardinal".

Finite promise games 
Each of the games is finite, predetermined in length, and has two players (Alice and Bob). At each turn, Alice chooses an integer or a number of integers (an offering) and the Bob has to make one of two kinds of promises restricting his future possible moves. In all games, Bob wins if and only if Bob has kept all of his promises.

Finite piecewise linear copy/invert games 
Here, all letters represent integers. We say that a map  is piecewise linear if  can be defined by various affine functions with integer coefficients on each of finitely many pieces, where each piece is defined by a finite set of linear inequalities with integer coefficients. We then define the game  for nonzero .

 has  rounds, and alternates between Alice and Bob. Bob is then required to either:

 Accept , thereby playing  and promising that there will be no -inversion of  among the integers ever played by Bob. This promise applies to all past, present and future plays in the game.

In RCA0, it can be proven that Bob always has a winning strategy for any given game. The game  is a modified version where Bob is forced to accept all factorial offers by Alice . The function  is the smallest  such that Bob can win  for any  such that  and  are greater than or equal to  and all the following values are less than :

 
 the number of pieces of 
 the absolute values of the coefficients of the inequalities in 
 the absolute values of the coefficients of the affine functions in

Finite polynomial copy/invert games 
Let  be a polynomial with integer coefficients. We now define the game  for nonzero , where  are polynomials with integer coefficients.  consists of  alternating plays by Alice and Bob. Bob is then required to either:

 Accept , thereby playing  and promising that there will be no special - or -inversion of  among the integers ever played by Bob. This promise applies to all past, present and future plays in the game.

Let  be polynomials with integer coefficients. In RCA0, it can be proven that Bob always has a winning strategy for any given game. If  are sufficiently large then Bob wins , which is  where Bob is forced to accept all double factorials  offered by Alice. The function  is the smallest  such that Bob can win  for any  such that  and  are greater than or equal to  and all the following values are less than :

 
  (the domain of the polynomials is )

Finite linear copy/invert games 
We say that  are additively equivalent if and only if . Bob is then required to either:

Let . In RCA0, it can be proven that Bob always has a winning strategy for any given game. Let . If  is sufficiently large, then Bob wins , where Bob accepts all factorials  offered by Alice. The function  is the smallest  such that Bob can win  for any  such that  is greater than or equal to ,  are positive and all the following values are less than :

 
 
 the number of components of each vector in

Functions 

Greedy clique sequences 
 denotes the set of all tuples of rational numbers. We use subscripts to denote indexes into tuples (starting at 1) and angle brackets to denote concatenation of tuples, e.g. .

Then if  is order invariant, we say that  is order invariant. When  is order invariant,  has infinite edges. We define a sequence  as a nonempty tuple  where . This is not a tuple but rather a tuple of tuples. When ,  is said to be an upper shift greedy clique sequence in  if it satisfies the following:

  consists only of zeroes.
 Let  be an integer such that , or a positive integer if we allow infinite sequences.  and let .

When ,  is said to be an upper shift down greedy clique sequence in  if it satisfies the following:

  consists only of zeroes.
 Let  be an integer such that , or a positive integer if we allow infinite sequences.  and let .

When ,  is said to be an extreme upper shift down greedy clique sequence in  if it satisfies the following:

  consists only of zeroes.
 Let  be an integer such that , or a positive integer if we allow infinite sequences.  and let .
 If , then .
 If , then .
  is a down clique in 

 
 

Given a thread , we say that is open if . Using this Harvey Friedman defined three very powerful functions:

  is the smallest  such that every simple, order invariant graph  has an upper shift greedy clique sequence in  of length at most  with an open thread.
  is the smallest  such that every order invariant digraph  has an upper shift greedy down clique sequence in  of length at most  with an open thread.
  is the smallest  such that every order invariant digraph  has an extreme upper shift greedy down clique sequence in  of length at most  with an open thread.

References 

 
 
 

Mathematical games
Mathematical concepts